Bask may refer to:

 to bask, or to sunbathe
 Bask, Gilan, Iran; a village
 Kalle Bask, a Finnish sailor
 Bask (horse) (1956–1979), an Arabian stallion
 Bask Om, a fictional character from Zeta Gundam
 Bäsk, a Swedish liquor
 FK BASK (ФК БАСК), a soccer team in Belgrade, Serbia
 Bask Technology, a U.S. tech support company

See also

 Bask, Iran (disambiguation), for places primarily spelled "Besk" but also spelled "Bask"
 Pulin Bihari Baske (born 1968), Indian politician
 Michael Baskes, a U.S. engineer
 
 BASC (disambiguation)
 Basque (disambiguation)